The name Felicia has been used for five tropical cyclones in the Eastern Pacific Ocean. Felicia replaced Fefa which was retired in 1992. Coincidentally, the five iterations of the name have altered between Category 4 and Tropical Storm intensity since the name arose in 1997.

 Hurricane Felicia (1997) – a Category 4 hurricane which formed in the open ocean, causing no known damage or casualties. 
 Tropical Storm Felicia (2003) – a moderate tropical storm which remained at sea, crossing into the Central Pacific, but then dissipated well east of Hawaii.
 Hurricane Felicia (2009) – a Category 4 hurricane which remained at sea, dissipating before hitting Hawaii.
 Tropical Storm Felicia (2015) – remained at sea as a weak tropical storm.
 Hurricane Felicia (2021) – an unusually small Category 4 hurricane which formed and dissipated in the open ocean.

In the South-West Indian:
 Tropical Storm Felicia (2000) – remained over the open ocean.

Pacific hurricane set index articles